The 1987 South Carolina Gamecocks football team represented the University of South Carolina as an independent during the 1987 NCAA Division I-A football season. Led by fifth-year head coach Joe Morrison, the Gamecocks compiled a record of 8–4 with a loss against LSU in the Gator Bowl.

Schedule

Roster

Rankings

Game summaries

at Georgia

at Nebraska

Virginia Tech

Clemson

at Miami (FL)

References

South Carolina
South Carolina Gamecocks football seasons
South Carolina Gamecocks football